The Quo Vadis was a French cyclecar manufactured in Courbevoie from 1921 until 1923. It featured a twin-cylinder Train engine.

References
 David Burgess Wise, The New Illustrated Encyclopedia of Automobiles.

Cyclecars
Defunct motor vehicle manufacturers of France